Mado Hot Spring National Park is a protected area of the Philippines located in barangay Awang in the municipality of Datu Odin Sinsuat, Maguindanao in Mindanao Island. The park covers an area of 48 hectares containing the medicinal hotspring, along with a natural swimming pool and health resort near the Awang Airport. It was declared a national park in 1939 by virtue of Republic Act No. 456.

References

See also
List of national parks of the Philippines

National parks of the Philippines
Hot springs of the Philippines
Protected areas established in 1939
1939 establishments in the Philippines
Tourist attractions in Maguindanao del Norte
Landforms of Maguindanao del Norte